USS Silversides (SSN-807) will be a Block 5  for the United States Navy, its third warship named for the silversides. It was ordered on 2 December 2019.

References
 

 
 

Virginia-class submarines
Submarines of the United States Navy
Proposed ships of the United States Navy